Xenocalamus michelli, or Michell's quill-snouted snake, is a species of venomous rear-fanged snake in the family Atractaspididae. The species is endemic to Africa.

Etymology
The specific name, michelli, is in honor of a Captain Michell who collected the holotype.

Geographic range
X. michelli is found in Katanga Province in southern Democratic Republic of the Congo.

Reproduction
X. michelli is oviparous.

References

Further reading
Müller L (1911). "Zwei neue Schlangen aus dem Katangadistrikt, Kongostaat ". Zoologischer Anzeiger 38: 357–360. (Xenocalamaus michelli, new species, pp. 359–360). (in German).

Atractaspididae
Reptiles described in 1911
Taxobox binomials not recognized by IUCN 
Endemic fauna of the Democratic Republic of the Congo